The IAI Harpy is a loitering munition missile produced by Israel Aerospace Industries. The Harpy is designed to attack radar systems and is optimised for the suppression of enemy air defences (SEAD) role. It carries a high explosive warhead. The Harpy has been sold to several foreign nations, including South Korea, Turkey, India, and China.

History
In the late 1980s, Kentron sold the designs for its ARD-10 loitering drone to IAI. IAI then used those designs to develop the Harpy which was first tested in 1989. The designs were sold to Iran Aviation Industries Organization in 2004/5 and used by Shahed Aviation Industries to develop the Shahed 131 and Shahed 136 drones.

In 2004, the Harpy became the focus of the effort by the United States to restrict arms transfers and the sales of advanced military technology to China. Sold to China in 1994 for around US$55 million, the loitering munitions were returned to Israel in 2004 under contract to be upgraded. The United States, fearing that the Harpy would pose a threat to Taiwanese and American forces in the case of a war with China, demanded that Israel seize the loitering munitions and nullify the contract.  According to Israel, the Harpy is an indigenously designed loitering munitions. It does not contain any US-produced sub-systems.  In 2005, the loitering munitions were returned to China without being upgraded.  This incident chilled relations between the United States and Israel, with Israel being suspended from its status as Security Cooperative Participant in the Joint Strike Fighter program. However, on 6 November 2005, Israel stated that it has been re-admitted into the program.

Specifications

Harpy

Mini Harpy

Operators

See also

 WB Electronics Warmate
 Shahed 131
 Raad 85 (UAV)
 NCSIST Chien Hsiang
 AeroVironment Switchblade

External link
 HARPY - Autonomous Weapon for All Weather. IAI website

References

Harpy
Tailless delta-wing aircraft
1990s Israeli military reconnaissance aircraft
Single-engined pusher aircraft
Israel–United States military relations
Wankel-engined aircraft
Loitering munition